Bashir Uddin Adarsha School and College is a school and college located in Mirpur-1, Dhaka, Bangladesh. This area is popular for the school. The school was established in 1968. The college building is currently under reconstruction.

History
The school was founded in 1968 by Alhaz Salem Uddin. He named it after his father, Bashir Uddin.

The college was established in 1995.

Students and staff
There are more than 2000 students studying at the institution and more than 50 teachers(since 2018).

See also

 Education in Bangladesh
 List of schools in Bangladesh

References

1968 establishments in East Pakistan
1995 establishments in Bangladesh
Educational institutions established in 1968
Educational institutions established in 1995
Schools in Dhaka District